"Spooning" of a patient's hands is a posture significant in medical diagnoses.

Spooning also may refer to:
Use of ceramic spoons in traditional Chinese medical discipline Gua Sha
Spooning (croquet), ball-handling technique
Spoons sex position for intercourse embracing with back of one person's body meeting front of another's

See also
Spoon (disambiguation)